The Jeep Commander is an automobile nameplate used by Jeep since 2005 for several SUV models:

 Jeep Commander (XK), a mid-size SUV produced from 2005 to 2010
 Jeep Commander (2022), a mid-size crossover SUV based on the Jeep Compass produced for markets outside North America since 2021
 Jeep Grand Commander, a mid-size crossover SUV produced for the Chinese market since 2018, also marketed as the Jeep Commander until 2020 for the two-row model

See also 
 Jeep Commando
 Mahindra Commander, an unrelated but Jeep-based vehicle produced by Mahindra
 Commander (disambiguation)

Commander
Cars introduced in 2005